Olof Bergström (21 November 1919 – 22 November 1984) was a Swedish actor. He appeared in 50 films and television shows between 1943 and 1984.

Selected filmography
 1945: Oss tjuvar emellan eller En burk ananas as Gustav, Olle's friend
 1969: Ådalen 31 as Olof Björklund	
 1969: Made in Sweden as Grönroos	
 1975:	Maria as the probation officer	
 1980:	To Be a Millionaire as Bengt Sundelin	
 1981:	Rasmus på luffen as the sheriff

References

External links

1919 births
1984 deaths
20th-century Swedish male actors
Swedish male film actors
Swedish male television actors
People from Karlskrona